Ruellia drymophila is a plant species in the family Acanthaceae, native to China.

Type specimen
The type specimen was collected by botanist George Forrest in August 1906, from the vicinity of Lijiang, Yunnan, at the forested base of a mountain (8500–10,000 ft elevation).

References

 GBIF entry

drymophila
Plants described in 1912
Flora of China